Monster Mini Golf is a franchised chain of entertainment centers. The locations feature an indoor, 18-hole glow-in-the-dark mini golf course, video and redemption arcade games, three-dimensional animatronic props, an in-house radio station, party rooms for hosting birthday parties and other special events, as well as laser-tag, laser-maze, and bowling in some of the newer, larger facilities. The parent company, Monster Entertainment, LLC is headquartered in Providence, Rhode Island, United States, and Las Vegas. As of January 2017 the chain has 29 locations, either open or under construction, across the United States.

History
Founders Christina and Patrick Vitagliano opened the first Monster Mini Golf in the small community of Danielson, Connecticut, on Memorial Day weekend in 2004. By 2005, they had made the decision to franchise, and were legal to offer franchises by November of that year. Monster Mini Golf has grown organically since inception, and as of January 2017, has grown to 29 locations in the US and Canada.

Before the inception of Monster Entertainment, Christina was the director of marketing for a multi-level entertainment complex in Providence, RI. Patrick was the founder of a sound/lighting/theatrical production company that provided sound and lighting for numerous Broadway theater productions and large concert tours. After marrying in 1997, Christina opened an antique auction house in Connecticut in 1998. Within four years it became one of the largest and most reputable auction houses in the area. In 2003 Christina decided to sell the business as the grueling hours and international travel become tiresome.

The concept for Monster Mini Golf was thought up on the way home from a weekend trip to New York City. Patrick sold his production company in 2004 and the couple combined their experience and talents to launch Monster Mini Golf. It took them five months to build the course and props before opening in an  space in an old textile mill that had housed Christina's former auction house. Monster Mini Golf became legal to franchise in November 2005.

Locations 
All locations incorporate glow-in-the-dark settings with fluorescent golf balls and monsters. The only consistent features in each franchise are the "Enter at Your Own Risk" sign that hangs above the cast-iron gated entrance to the "cemetery," a hole featuring a mole hill with the cup inside the mole hill, a hole with a tricky path (hole in the middle of a hill followed by an animatronic organ player at the top of the hill), and the trademark clown statue that escorts customers out after the last hole (parody of the movie Happy Gilmore except this clown does not laugh and block the ball as it did in movie). Locations typically include two party rooms and an arcade with games such as glow-in-the-dark air hockey tables, custom-made glow-in-the-dark pool tables and arcade games as well as ticket redemption games such as glow Skee Ball.

KISS by Monster Mini Golf
In 2012, the company opened KISS by Monster Mini Golf in Las Vegas, Nevada, a facility themed around hard rock band KISS. Currently located in the Rio All Suite Hotel and Casino, this location features the typical Monster Mini Golf fare (but heavily KISS-themed), a rock and roll themed wedding chapel called "The Love It Loud Wedding Chapel", the world's largest KISS gift shop, and a museum featuring memorabilia from the band's storied career on display. It also hosts regular appearances by KISS band members, both past and present.

Franchise 
Monster Mini Golf had been nominated by franchisees for Top New Franchise on Bizzia.com in 2007. Customers have also shown their interest, based on the company’s uniqueness and creativity behind the indoor mini golf concept.
As of 2017, there are currently 28 franchised locations in the US and Canada.

Monster Cable vs. Monster Mini Golf 
Monster Cable brought suit against Monster Mini Golf in 2006. Noel Lee, The CEO of Monster Cable, claimed that the public would be confused by the similarity of the names Monster Cable and Monster Mini Golf. After mediation and royalty suggestions that the owners deemed to be unfair; Monster Mini Golf launched a grassroots campaign against Monster Cable on the Internet, which managed to garner nationwide attention and support. After receiving hundreds of complaints from the public, Monster Cable dropped the lawsuit and agreed to pay up to $200,000 of Monster Mini Golf's legal fees.

References

External links
 

Franchises
Entertainment companies established in 2004
Miniature golf
Animatronic attractions